The Faroe Islands competed at the 2008 Summer Paralympics in Beijing, China, but did not win a medal. The team consisted of a single competitor, Heidi Andreasen, who took part in four swimming events.

Swimming

See also 
Faroe Islands at the Paralympics

References

Nations at the 2008 Summer Paralympics
2008
Paralympics